Mahendra Kumar Roy (born 31 December 1955) was a member of the 15th Lok Sabha. He was elected on a CPI(M)  ticket from the Jalpaiguri Lok Sabha constituency.

The son of the late Harendra Kumar Roy and the late Nanibala Roy, he was born at Goriapara village in Jalpaiguri district. He has a B.A. and B.Ed. from A.C. College and A.C. Training College, Jalpaiguri.

He started his political activities at the village level. He was in the gram panchayat during 1978–1988, was a member of the Panchyat Samiti 1993–1998, and a member of Jalpaiguri Zila Parishad 1998–2003. He was elected to the West Bengal assembly from the Rajganj Vidhan Sabha constituency in 2006.

References

Living people
India MPs 2009–2014
People from Jalpaiguri district
Communist Party of India (Marxist) politicians from West Bengal
1955 births
Lok Sabha members from West Bengal
Communist Party of India (Marxist) candidates in the 2014 Indian general election
West Bengal district councillors